Aiambak Airport  is an airfield serving Aiambak, in the Western Province of Papua New Guinea.

References

External links
 

Airports in Papua New Guinea
Western Province (Papua New Guinea)